Princess Shi (personal name unknown), who might have taken the title Empress Shi at one point, was the wife of Lü Guang (Emperor Yiwu), the founder of the Di-led Later Liang dynasty of China.

Very little is known about her. What is known is that when Lü Guang, who was then a Former Qin general, was sent by the Former Qin emperor Fu Jiān in 383 on a mission to subdue the Xiyu (西域, modern Xinjiang and former Soviet Central Asia) kingdoms, she did not accompany her husband but remained in the Former Qin capital Chang'an with his son Lü Shao, who was probably her son as well.  

When Chang'an fell to Western Yan forces in 385, they fled to the semi-independent state Chouchi, and after Lü Guang established Later Liang after returning from his Xiyu mission and seizing Liang Province (涼州, modern central and western Gansu), they arrived in his capital Guzang (姑臧, in modern Wuwei, Gansu) in 389.  Lü Guang, who then carried the title Prince of Sanhe, created her his princess and created Lü Shao heir apparent.  

By the time he claimed the imperial title "Heavenly Prince" (Tian Wang) in 396 and created Lü Shao crown prince, she was not mentioned, implying that she might have died by that point, and there was no further reference to her in history.  If she had in fact survived to 396, she would have likely been created empress.  The table below assumes that she survived to 400 when Lü Guang died, but that was in fact not likely.

References 

|- style="text-align: center;"

|- style="text-align: center;"

|-

|-

|-

Later Liang (Sixteen Kingdoms) empresses
4th-century deaths
Year of birth unknown